Steven Geray (born István Gyergyai, 10 November 190426 December 1973) was a Hungarian-born American film actor who appeared in over 100 films and dozens of television programs. Geray appeared in numerous famed A-pictures, including   Alfred Hitchcock's Spellbound (1945) and To Catch a Thief (1955), Joseph L. Mankiewicz's All About Eve (1950), and Howard Hawks' Gentlemen Prefer Blondes (1953).  However, it was in film noir that be became a fixture, being cast in over a dozen pictures in the genre.  Among them were The Mask of Dimitrios (1944), Gilda (1946),  The Unfaithful (1947), In a Lonely Place (1950), and The House on Telegraph Hill (1951).

Early life
Geray was born István Gyergyai in Ungvár, Austria-Hungary (now Uzhhorod, Ukraine) and educated at the University of Budapest.

Career
Geray made his first stage appearance at the Hungarian National Theater under his real name and after nearly four years he made his London stage debut (as Steven Geray) in 1934, appearing in Happy Week-End! He began appearing in English-speaking films in 1935 and moved to Hollywood in 1941. He appeared alongside his wife, Magda Kun, whom he married in 1934, in the 1935 film Dance Band.

Political pressure led to Geray's exit from Europe. His act in the Folies Bergère included impersonations of Adolf Hitler and Benito Mussolini, which incurred the wrath of the governments of Germany and Italy. Geray failed to heed their warnings to stop the impersonations. After being beaten up, however, he moved to Hollywood.

Geray was cast as the lead in a low-budget film noir So Dark the Night (1946). Even with its limited budget, it received positive critical reviews and enabled its director Joseph H. Lewis to later direct A-pictures. 

During his prime in cinema Geray appeared in many top-rated movies, including  Alfred Hitchcock's Spellbound (1945) and To Catch a Thief (1955), Joseph L. Mankiewicz's All About Eve (1950), and Howard Hawks' Gentlemen Prefer Blondes (1953).  He found a niche in crime and adventure films such as Background to Danger (1943), Appointment in Berlin (1943), and A Bullet for Joey (1955), but it was in film noir where be became a fixture.  Among his castings in the genre were The Mask of Dimitrios (1944), Cornered (1945), Deadline at Dawn (1946), Gilda (1946), The Unfaithful (1947), The Dark Past (1948), In a Lonely Place (1950), The Second Woman (1950), A Lady Without Passport (1950), Woman on the Run (1950), The House on Telegraph Hill (1951), Affair in Trinidad (1952), and New York Confidential (1955).

Geray continued to work on television and in films into the 1960s. Among them a guest appearance on Perry Mason in 1962 as extortionist and murder victim Franz Moray in "The Case of the Stand-in Sister",  three episodes  of The George Burns and Gracie Allen Show as French dress designer Gaston Broussard in 1956, including the over the top "A Paris Creation" and various doctor roles on The Danny Thomas Show.

Personal life
Geray spent some time in the late-1960s in Estes Park, Colorado, where he directed local theater (The Fantasticks). He owned and ran a bar in Estes Park from 1969 to 1970.

Geray died 26 December 1973 in Los Angeles, California. He was cremated, and his ashes were given to his wife.

Selected filmography

Mária növér (1929)
Csókolj meg, édes! (1932) - Pali, medikus
Spring Shower (1932) - Urasági intézõ
Flying Gold (1932) - Bálint György, az Esti Hírek újságírója
Pardon, tévedtem (1933)
Az ellopott szerda (1933) - Tamás István, rádióriporter
Dance Band (1935) - Steve Sarel
The Student's Romance (1935) - Mickey
A Star Fell from Heaven (1936) - Willi Wass
Let's Make a Night of It (1937) - Luigi
Modern Girls (1937) - Székely Feri
Családi pótlék (1937) - Kovács Péter
Premiere (1938) - Frolich
Lightning Conductor (1938) - Morley
Inspector Hornleigh (1939) - Michael Kavanos
Dark Streets of Cairo (1940) - Bellboy
Man at Large (1941) - Karl Botany, alias C.B. Haldane
The Shanghai Gesture (1941) - Man in Casino Helping Boris (uncredited)
Blue, White and Perfect (1942) - Vanderhoefen
A Gentleman at Heart (1942) - Don Fernando
Castle in the Desert (1942) - Dr. Retling
Secret Agent of Japan (1942) - Alecsandri
The Wife Takes a Flyer (1942) - Gestapo Agent (uncredited)
The Mad Martindales (1942) - Jan Van Der Venne
Eyes in the Night (1942) - Mr. Anderson
The Moon and Sixpence (1942) - Dirk Stroeve
Once Upon a Honeymoon (1942) - Café Waiter (uncredited)
Assignment in Brittany (1943) - Priest (uncredited)
Above Suspicion (1943) - Anton - Woodcarver (uncredited)
Night Plane from Chungking (1943) - Rev. Dr. Ven Der Lieden
Henry Aldrich Swings It (1943) - Frank 'Silky' Ganz (uncredited)
Pilot #5 (1943) - Major Eichel
Background to Danger (1943) - Ludwig Rader (uncredited)
Appointment in Berlin (1943) - Henri Rader (uncredited)
Hostages (1943) - Mueller
Phantom of the Opera (1943) - Vercheres
Whistling in Brooklyn (1943) - Whitey
Meet the People (1944) - Uncle Felix
The Mask of Dimitrios (1944) - Karel Bulic
The Seventh Cross (1944) - Dr. Loewenstein
Resisting Enemy Interrogation (1944) - Dr. Victor Münz - Camp Doctor (uncredited)
In Society (1944) - Baron Sergei
The Conspirators (1944) - Dr. Schmitt
Hotel Berlin (1945) - Kleibert
Tarzan and the Amazons (1945) - Brenner
Spellbound (1945) - Dr. Graff
The Crimson Canary (1945) - Vic Miller
Mexicana (1945) - Laredo
Cornered (1945) - Señor Tomas Camargo
Deadline at Dawn (1946) - Edward Honig
Gilda (1946) - Uncle Pio
So Dark the Night (1946) - Henri Cassin
Blondie Knows Best (1946) - Dr. Schmidt
The Return of Monte Cristo (1946) - Bombelles
The Unfaithful (1947) - Martin Barrow
Blind Spot (1947) - Lloyd Harrison
Mr. District Attorney (1947) - Berotti
Gunfighters (1947) - Jose - aka Uncle Joe
When a Girl's Beautiful (1947) - Stacy Dorn
The Crime Doctor's Gamble (1947) - Jules Daudet
I Love Trouble (1948) - Keller
Port Said (1948) - Alexis Tacca
The Dark Past (1948) - Prof. Fred Linder
Ladies of the Chorus (1948) - Salisbury
The Lone Wolf and His Lady (1949) - Mynher Van Groot
El Paso (1949) - Mexican Joe
Sky Liner (1949) - Bokejian
Once More, My Darling (1949) - Kalzac
Holiday in Havana (1949) - Lopez
Tell It to the Judge (1949) - Francois, Headwaiter (uncredited)
Under My Skin (1950) - Bartender (uncredited)
Harbor of Missing Men (1950) - Captain Corcoris
Beware of Blondie (1950) - Matre'd Coq D'or (uncredited)
In a Lonely Place (1950) - Paul, Headwaiter
The Second Woman (1950) - Balthazar Jones
A Lady Without Passport (1950) - Frenchman, Palinov's Tout
Woman on the Run (1950) - Dr. Hohler
All About Eve (1950) - Captain of Waiters
Pygmy Island (1950) - Leon Marko
Target Unknown (1951) - Jean
I Can Get It for You Wholesale (1951) - Bettini (uncredited)
The House on Telegraph Hill (1951) - Dr. Burkhardt
Savage Drums (1951) - Borodoff
Little Egypt (1951) - Pasha
My Favorite Spy (1951) - Croupier (uncredited)
Lady Possessed (1952) - Dr. Stepanek
Bal Tabarin (1952) - Inspector Manet
Affair in Trinidad (1952) - Wittol
The Big Sky (1952) - 'Frenchy' Jourdonnais
O. Henry's Full House (1952) - Boris Radolf (segment "The Last Leaf") (uncredited)
Night Without Sleep (1952) - George (uncredited)
Tonight We Sing (1953) - Prager
The Story of Three Loves (1953) - Legay (segment "Equilibrium") (uncredited)
Call Me Madam (1953) - Prime Minister Sebastian
Gentlemen Prefer Blondes (1953) - Hotel Manager
The Golden Blade (1953) - Barcus
The Royal African Rifles (1953) - Van Stede
The French Line (1953) - François, Ship Steward
The Great Diamond Robbery (1954) - Van Goosen
Paris Playboys (1954) - Dr. Gaspard
Knock on Wood (1954) - Dr. Kreuger
Tobor the Great (1954) - The Foreign Spy-Chief
New York Confidential (1955) - Morris Franklin
A Bullet for Joey (1955) - Raphael Garcia
Daddy Long Legs (1955) - Emile (uncredited)
To Catch a Thief (1955) - Hotel Desk Clerk (uncredited)
Kiss of Fire (1955) - Ship Captain Bellon
Artists and Models (1955) - Kurt's Associate (uncredited)
The Adventures of Fu Manchu (1956) - Otto Helgaard
The Birds and the Bees (1956) - Bartender (uncredited)
Adventures of Superman (1956, TV series, Episode: The Deadly Rock) - Professor Van Wick 
Attack (1956) - Otto - German NCO
Stagecoach to Fury (1956) - Nichols
The Gift of Love (1958) - Toy Shop Owner (uncredited)
A Certain Smile (1958) - Denis
Verboten! (1959) - Mayor (Burghermeister) of Rothbach
Count Your Blessings (1959) - Guide
The Real McCoys (1962, TV Series, Episode: The Diamond Ring) - Mr. Schneider
Perry Mason (1962, TV Series) - Franz Moray
Bonanza (1962, TV Series) - Alexander Dubois ("The Dowry")
Dime with a Halo (1963) - Priest
The Evil of Frankenstein (1964) - Dr. Sergado (additional sequence: US) (uncredited)
Wild and Wonderful (1964) - Bartender
Ship of Fools (1965) - Steward aboard Vera (uncredited)
Our Man Flint (1966) - Israeli Diplomat (uncredited)
Jesse James Meets Frankenstein's Daughter (1966) - Dr. Rudolph Frankenstein
The Swinger (1966) - Man with Fish (final film role)

References

External links

 

1904 births
1973 deaths
Hungarian male film actors
American male film actors
Hungarian emigrants to the United States
People from Estes Park, Colorado
20th-century American male actors